Line 2 o ML-2 of Madrid's Metro Ligero (Spain) is a light rail line 8.7 km long. It has 13 stations, 3 of them underground, and was built between 2004 and 2007. It connects Colonia Jardín (Latina district) with Aravaca, crossing Pozuelo de Alarcón.

Itinerary 
ML2 line starts at Colonia Jardín Station. Then it borders Ciudad de la Imagen, crosses Somosaguas, the Universidad Complutense campus and Pozuelo de Alarcón town center. The line ends at Aravaca.

See also 
 Madrid Metro Ligero
 Madrid Metro
 Transport in Madrid

References 

Madrid Metro
Railway lines opened in 2007